Park Hall is a residential area in Walsall, England.

Park Hall may also refer to:
Park Hall, Oswestry, a football ground in Oswestry, Shropshire, England
Park Hall, Shetland, a derelict listed building on the Mainland of Shetland, Scotland
Park Hall, Washington County, Maryland, United States

See also
Park Hall Countryside Experience, a museum in Oswestry, Shropshire, England

Architectural disambiguation pages